Georg Ivanov Vasilev (born 29 October 1995) is a former Bulgarian footballer who played as a midfielder.

Club statistics

Club
As of 1 May 2016

References

External links

Living people
1995 births
Bulgarian footballers
Association football midfielders
FC Lokomotiv 1929 Sofia players
PFC Marek Dupnitsa players
PFC Slavia Sofia players
First Professional Football League (Bulgaria) players